Farkash is a Hungarian surname, meaning Wolf that may refer to:

People

Surname
Aharon Ze'evi-Farkash (born 1948), Israeli general.
Amit Farkash (born 1989), Canadian-born Israeli actress and singer.
David Farkash, Israeli footballer.
Safia Farkash (born 1952), widow of the former Libyan leader Muammar Gaddafi.
Ya'akov Farkash (1923–2002), Israeli caricaturist and illustrator.

Other uses 
 Farkash Gallery collection, the largest collection in the world of vintage historical Israeli posters.

Hebrew-language surnames